Venkataraman Raghavan (1908–1979) was a Sanskrit scholar and musicologist. He was the recipient of numerous awards, including the Padma Bhushan and the Sahitya Akademi Award for Sanskrit, and authored over 120 books and 1200 articles.

Early life
Raghavan was born on 22 August 1908, in Tiruvarur in the Tanjore District of south India (Tamil Nadu).

V. Raghavan lost his parents, father Venkataraman and mother Meenakshi, when he was only seven years old, on account of which Kamalamba, his mother's elder sister, took charge of the family and raised him and his three brothers and two sisters. During these days, V. Raghavan came under the tutelage of Pandit Sengalipuram Appaswamy Shastrigal[2] and attended the Board High School in Tiruvarur.

Education
He graduated from Presidency College, Madras in 1930 with 3 College Prizes and 5 University Medals. He received his M.A. in Sanskrit Language and Literature with Comparative Philology and four schools of Indian Philosophy under Mahamahopadhyaya Prof. S. Kuppuswamy Sastri. He specialized in Alamkara and Natya Sastras and Sanskrit Aesthetics and earned his doctorate in 1934–1935 with  Profs. S. Levi, F.W. Thomas and A.B. Keith as examiners. Additionally, he studied Sanskrit on the traditional lines also and won medals and prizes for Sanskrit speaking and writing.

Academic career
After a brief tenure as the superintendent of the Thanjavur Maharaja Serfoji's Saraswathi Mahal Library, Raghavan joined Madras University in 1934 as a Ph.D. assistant and in 1935 as a lecturer. Rising to the rank of professor and head of the Department of Sanskrit, he held the latter position until his retirement in 1968.

In 1931, he paid frequent visits to Tanjore villages with K.V. Ramachandran to highlight the traditional Natakas of the Bhagavata's at Merattur, Sulamangalam. He presented a paper in the Madras Music Academy's annual conference session on "Some Names in Early Sangita Literature" in 1932. He wrote film scripts for Puranas, epics, and Sanskrit classics at a friend's request without making money out of it. He also played an active role in producing dialogue, general advice, and scenario for three films, Sita Kalyanam (1934), Chandrasena (1935) and Jalaja (1938).

In the same year, he wrote reviews for the renowned magazines Sound & Shadow and Triveni on Carnatic music, Bharatanatya, and Harikatha performances.

Proficient in reading and deciphering palm-leaf manuscripts in Sanskrit, Prakrit, and Pali, V. Raghavan discovered, edited, and published numerous previously unpublished works during his long tenure at the University of Madras. Starting in 1935 and until his retirement from the university, he cataloged the discovered manuscripts in a publication series called the New Catalogus Catalogorum. For this endeavor, he gathered information on manuscripts in libraries, research institutions, monasteries, and private collections in India and abroad.

From 1953 to 1954, he toured Europe in search of Indian manuscripts in libraries, museums, and research institutions, discovering and cataloging about 20,000 previously uncatalogued manuscripts and an equal number of cataloged manuscripts. In addition, he surveyed Sanskrit and Indological studies in European universities and other institutions. He was invited to the USSR twice and to countries of East and Southeast Asia, Australia, Mauritius, Mexico, and Nepal, where he continued cataloging manuscripts, among other activities such as lecturing.

In 1936, he contributed to the Journal of Oriental Research, submitting the first comprehensive study of the Number of Rasas, i.e., Rasa, Aucitya, and Dhvani. The first edition of Number of Rasas was published by the Adyar Library and Research Centre, Chennai, in 1940. He also became the secretary of Madras Music Academy by the end of 1944 and was selected as the secretary of the All-India Oriental Conference (A.I.O.C.) in 1951.

Raghavan was among the founders of the Kuppuswami Sastri Research Institute and served as its secretary and journal editor until his death. He was the secretary (1951–1959) and the general president (1961) of the All-India Oriental Conference. He was a founding member of the Sanskrit Commission of the Government of India and the chairman of the Central Sanskrit Institute. Late 1972 was marked as the year of his presidency for the International Association of Sanskrit Studies. He served as the chairman of the organizing committee of the International Ramayan Conference, Sahitya Akademi, and led the conference in 1974. In the same year, he became the president of the Second World Sanskrit Conference at the University of Turin, Italy, and steered the conference.

He was a founding member of the Sahitya Akademi and the Sangeet Natak Akademi, and the founding editor of Samskrita Pratibha, a journal of the Sahitya Akademi (1958–1979). V. Raghavan advised and supervised 22 Ph.D., M.Litt., and non-degree students in their research and publications. He remained a life-long mentor for his students from all over the world.

Sanskrit
He authored several articles and books on music and aesthetics in English, Tamil, and Sanskrit.

In 1963, he published a fully edited and translated Bhoja's Śṛṅgāra-prakāśa, a treatise in 36 chapters dealing with both poetics and dramaturgy, and the largest known work in Sanskrit poetics. For this work and his commentary, he won the Sahitya Akademi Award for Sanskrit in 1966. He was awarded the prestigious Jawaharlal Nehru Fellowship in 1969. It was later published as volume 53 of the Harvard Oriental Series in 1998.

He translated into Sanskrit Rabindranath Tagore first drama, Valmiki Pratibha, which deals with the transformation of Valmiki from a bandit into a poet.

He discovered and edited an ancient Sanskrit play, Udatta Raghavam by Mayuraja.

He founded an organisation, Samskrita Ranga in 1958, that deals with Sanskrit theatre and has enacted Sanskrit plays.

He was known both for his command of primary texts and for making them accessible through his articles and commentaries.

Music
As a musicologist, he specialized in Carnatic music. He was the secretary of the Madras Music Academy from 1944 until his death. A "Dr. V. Raghavan Research Centre" has since been named after him. He has also composed several songs including "Candrashekharam Ashraye" on Jagadguru Shri Chandrasekharendra Saraswati Swamy and Maithreem Bhajata, which were later rendered by the famous Carnatic musician Smt.M. S. Subbulakshmi.

Legacy
On his birth centenary, celebrations were held in August 2008.  A book Smriti Kusumanjali was released, compiling tributes to him on his 60th birthday from personalities including then-president Dr. S. Radhakrishnan and vice-president V. V. Giri.

References

External links
 Article  in Sruti magazine.
 The Music Academy 
 "A Colossus Remembered" 

Carnatic musicians
Indian Sanskrit scholars
Musicians from Chennai
1979 deaths
Recipients of the Sahitya Akademi Award in Sanskrit
1908 births
20th-century Indian musicians
Jawaharlal Nehru Fellows
Recipients of the Padma Bhushan in literature & education
Translators of Rabindranath Tagore
Recipients of the Sangeet Natak Akademi Fellowship